Loose Screw is the eighth studio album by rock group The Pretenders, and was released in 2002. It was the first time that the Pretenders had the same credited band line-up (Chrissie Hynde, Martin Chambers, Andy Hobson and Adam Seymour) on three consecutive studio albums.

Track listing
All songs written by Adam Seymour and Chrissie Hynde, except where noted.
"Lie to Me" – 2:23
"Time" – 3:58
"You Know Who Your Friends Are" – 3:30
"Complex Person" – 2:47
"Fools Must Die" – 2:36
"Kinda Nice, I Like It" – 3:37
"Nothing Breaks Like a Heart" (Hynde, Billy Steinberg, Tom Kelly) – 3:28
"I Should Of" – 4:03
"Clean Up Woman" – 3:25
"The Losing" – 4:51
"Saving Grace" (Hynde, Steinberg, Kelly) – 3:20
"Walk like a Panther" (Richard Barratt, Jason Buckle, Jarvis Cocker, Dean Honer) – 4:42

2003 UK and Brazil Eagle Records edition bonus tracks
"Complicada" [Complex Person Spanish version] – 2:57
"I Wish You Love" (Charles Trenet, Albert Beach) – 10:32

Personnel
The Pretenders
Chrissie Hynde – rhythm guitar, lead vocals
Adam Seymour – lead guitar, backing vocals
Andy Hobson – bass
Martin Chambers – drums

Additional personnel
Kevin Bacon – bass
Jonathan Quarmby – keyboards
Colin Elliot – percussion
Mark "Wiff" Smith – percussion
Priscilla Jones – backing vocals
Tom Kelly – backing vocals
Mark Sheridan – backing vocals
The Duke Quartet – strings, brass
Kick Horns – brass

References

External links
 

The Pretenders albums
2002 albums
Albums produced by Kevin Bacon (producer)
Albums produced by Jonathan Quarmby
Artemis Records albums